Half Marriage may refer to:

 Half Marriage (film), a 1929 American melodramatic pre-Code film
 Half Marriage (TV series), an Indian drama series